Judith Cynthia Aline Keppel (born 18 August 1942) is a British quiz show contestant who was the first person to win one million pounds on the British television game show Who Wants to Be a Millionaire?. She has appeared on the former BBC Two, now Channel 5, quiz show Eggheads since its inception in 2003, until she retired from the show in 2022.

Early life
Keppel was born at Wolverhampton, eldest of three children and only daughter of the Hon. Walter Arnold Crispian Keppel (1914–1996), DSC, and Aline Lucy (1918-2007), daughter of Brigadier-General John Harington, CB, CMG, of Chelmarsh Hall, Bridgnorth, Shropshire (son of Sir Richard Harington, 11th Baronet) and Lady Frances Aline, daughter of William Temple-Gore-Langton, 4th Earl Temple of Stowe. Walter Keppel was a lieutenant commander in the Royal Navy’s Fleet Air Arm. 

The family moved around, thanks to various naval postings, before settling in London when Keppel was seventeen. She sat A-Levels at St Mary's School, Wantage, and then completed a secretarial course.  

Keppel is a granddaughter of Walter Keppel, 9th Earl of Albemarle. Her great-grandfather, the 8th Earl, was the brother of George Keppel and the brother-in-law of Alice Keppel, a mistress of King Edward VII and the great-great uncle of Camilla, Queen consort of the United Kingdom, who is thus her third cousin. Through her grandfather, her ancestors include Eleanor of Aquitaine and Henry II of England, who were the subjects of her one million-pound question on Who Wants to Be a Millionaire?.

Marriages
In 1964, Keppel married her first husband, Desmond Leon Corcoran, an art dealer with whom she had three children, Sibylla, Alexander, and Rosie, but they divorced in 1980. In 1985, she married comedy scriptwriter Neil Shand. They were separated in 1987.

TV quiz shows

Keppel appeared on the 20 November 2000 episode of the UK edition of Who Wants to Be a Millionaire?, becoming the 12th winner in the world and the first in the UK to win one million pounds. At the time, she was a garden designer living in Fulham and was "struggling for money". Nonetheless, she had spent about £100 phoning the quiz show more than 50 times to secure a place. "BT rang me up and said, 'Do you realise your telephone bills are rising?'"

There was speculation at the time that the win was leaked to the press so that ITV would draw ratings away from BBC One which was showing the last episode of One Foot in the Grave in the same timeslot. However, the Independent Television Commission cleared Celador and ITV of the allegations.

Keppel formerly appeared on the Channel 5 quiz show Eggheads, where she and other quiz champions are pitted against four members of the public.

References

External links 
 

1942 births
Contestants on British game shows
Living people
People from Fulham
Judith Keppel
People educated at Heathfield School, Ascot
People educated at St Mary’s School, Wantage